is a badminton player from Japan. Born in Ōita, Ōita Prefecture, she joined Renesas badminton club and later affiliated with Saishunkan team. She was a bronze medalist at the 2011 BWF World Championships with her partner Miyuki Maeda.

Career 
Suetsuna has gained prominence in badminton through her success in women's doubles with her partner Miyuki Maeda, and the partnerships known by the Japanese media as "Suemae". Together they won the 2010 Denmark Open, their first major tournament victory. They went on to win the 2011 Malaysia Grand Prix Gold and the 2011 India Open. Suetsuna and Maeda also have two bronze medals from major competitions from making the semifinals at the 2011 London World Championships and 2010 Uber Cup in Kuala Lumpur. She competed at the 2006 and 2010 Asian Games as well in 2008 and 2012 Olympic Games. In 2008 Beijing Olympics, with her women's doubles partner Maeda, they finished fourth, the 2nd best performance to date by Japanese badminton players at the Olympics.

Satoko Suetsuna has competed with several men in mixed doubles, but has not achieved the same level of success as she has in her main event.

Suetsuna retired from the Japan team in September 2013.

Achievements

BWF World Championships 
Women's doubles

BWF Superseries 
The BWF Superseries, which was launched on 14 December 2006 and implemented in 2007, is a series of elite badminton tournaments, sanctioned by the Badminton World Federation (BWF). BWF Superseries levels are Superseries and Superseries Premier. A season of Superseries consists of twelve tournaments around the world that have been introduced since 2011. Successful players are invited to the Superseries Finals, which are held at the end of each year.

Women's doubles

  BWF Superseries Finals tournament
  BWF Superseries Premier tournament
  BWF Superseries tournament

BWF Grand Prix 
The BWF Grand Prix had two levels, the BWF Grand Prix and Grand Prix Gold. It was a series of badminton tournaments sanctioned by the Badminton World Federation (BWF) which was held from 2007 to 2017.

Women's doubles

  BWF Grand Prix Gold tournament
  BWF Grand Prix tournament

Record against selected opponents 
Record against year-end Finals finalists, World Championships semi-finalists, and Olympic quarter-finalists.

Miyuki Maeda 

  Leanne Choo & Renuga Veeran 2–0
  Alex Bruce & Michelle Li 1–0
  Cheng Shu & Zhao Yunlei 0–2
  Du Jing & Yu Yang 0–5
  Gao Ling & Huang Sui 0–1
  Ma Jin & Wang Xiaoli 0–1
  Tian Qing & Zhao Yunlei 0–3
  Wang Xiaoli & Yu Yang 0–5
  Wei Yili & Zhang Yawen 0–2
  Wei Yili & Zhao Tingting 0–2
  Yang Wei & Zhang Jiewen 1–2
  Cheng Wen-hsing & Chien Yu-chin 1–11
  Christinna Pedersen & Kamilla Rytter Juhl 2–3
  Jwala Gutta & Ashwini Ponnappa 4–1
  Vita Marissa & Liliyana Natsir 1–2
  Nitya Krishinda Maheswari & Greysia Polii 1–2
  Mizuki Fujii & Reika Kakiiwa 2–0
  Kumiko Ogura & Reiko Shiota 0–2
  Misaki Matsutomo & Ayaka Takahashi 2–1
  Chin Eei Hui & Wong Pei Tty 4–4
  Valeria Sorokina & Nina Vislova 5–0
  Jiang Yanmei & Li Yujia 0–3
  Lee Hyo-jung & Lee Kyung-won 0–7

References 

1981 births
Living people
People from Ōita (city)
Sportspeople from Ōita Prefecture
Japanese female badminton players
Badminton players at the 2008 Summer Olympics
Badminton players at the 2012 Summer Olympics
Olympic badminton players of Japan
Badminton players at the 2006 Asian Games
Badminton players at the 2010 Asian Games
Asian Games silver medalists for Japan
Asian Games medalists in badminton
Medalists at the 2006 Asian Games